The Battalion for Special Operations "Griffins" is part of 72nd Brigade for Special Operations of the Serbian Armed Forces. Its main tasks are reconnaissance, commando actions and sabotage and demolition. The symbol of the unit is the griffin.

History
With establishment of 72nd Special Brigade in 1992 there were 1st reconnaissance-commando battalion and 2nd reconnaissance-commando battalion. Those two battalions merged in 2006 into single reconnaissance-commando battalion "Griffins".

Training
Range of combat training is very broad and includes tactical, fire and physical training of the highest professional risk. In addition to a very demanding selective training, further training is conducted:

 Training in the use of cold weapons, the implementation of martial art skills, the use of weapons with high firepower
 Training complex action tactics of special operations
 Training in parachuting, diving, swimming, climbing and rescue services

82nd River Underwater Demolition Company

Part of the battalion is 82nd River Underwater Demolition Company (frogmen, river reconnaissance, underwater demolition and sabotage) diving unit. It is derived from 82nd Marine Center "Shadows" - Yugoslavia's version of the US Navy SEALs.

See also
72nd Brigade for Special Operations
Battalion "Hawks"

References

External links
Special Brigade

72nd Reconnaissance-commando Battalion
Battalions of Serbia
Military units and formations established in 1992